Oleg Vasilyevich Pravilo (born 27 October 1988) is a Russian former professional football player.

Club career
He made his Russian Football National League debut for FC Dynamo Bryansk on 27 March 2010 in a game against FC Shinnik Yaroslavl. That was his only season in the FNL.

External links
 

1988 births
People from Maykop
Living people
Russian footballers
Association football defenders
FC Armavir players
FC SKA Rostov-on-Don players
FC Dynamo Bryansk players
Sportspeople from Adygea